"My Life" is a 1969 song by Phil Ochs, a US singer-songwriter best known for the protest songs he wrote in the 1960s.

"My Life" is the fifth song on Rehearsals for Retirement, an album Ochs recorded in the aftermath of the protests at the 1968 Democratic National Convention in Chicago. In the song, Ochs says that his life, which had once been a joy, had become like death to him.

In "My Life", Ochs sings "Take everything I own/Take your tap from my phone/And leave my life alone." Years after his death, it was revealed that the FBI had a file of nearly 500 pages on Ochs.

References

1969 singles
Phil Ochs songs
Songs written by Phil Ochs
1969 songs
A&M Records singles